This is a list of Danish television related events from 1998.

Events 

Debuts 

 1 Sep - Robinson Ekspeditionen (1998–present)

Television shows 

Strisser på Samsø (1997-1998)
The Fairytaler (1998-2003)
Taxa (1997-1998)

Births

Deaths

References